Santa Teresa is a municipality located in the Brazilian state of Espírito Santo. Its population was 23,724 (2020) and its area is 695 km².

The municipality contains the  Augusto Ruschi Biological Reserve, a fully protected area.

Residents

Anderson Varejão of the NBA's Cleveland Cavaliers is originally from Santa Teresa.

References

Municipalities in Espírito Santo